Harry Lester may refer to:

The Great Lester (1878–1956) Polish-American ventriloquist 
Harry Lester (1895–1993), American comedy musician, son of John Lester (showman)
Justin Lester (wrestler)  (born 1983), American Greco-Roman wrestler